Nikolay Zagvozdin (born 31 August 1991) is a Belarusian professional footballer who plays for Lokomotiv Gomel.

References

External links 
 
 

1991 births
Living people
Belarusian footballers
Association football midfielders
FC Dinamo Minsk players
FC Bereza-2010 players
FC Khimik Svetlogorsk players
FC Gorodeya players
FC Lokomotiv Gomel players
FC Granit Mikashevichi players
FC Lida players
FC Sputnik Rechitsa players
FC Shakhtyor Petrikov players